Johan van der Meer may refer to:

Johan van der Meer (painter, born 1628), lived and worked in Haarlem
Johan van der Meer (painter, born 1630), lived and worked in Utrecht
Johan van der Meer (painter, born 1632), lived and worked in Delft
Johan van der Meer (painter, born 1656), lived and worked in Haarlem
Johan van der Meer (conductor), Dutch choral conductor